Rhamnus crocea, the spiny redberry, is a species of plant in the family Rhamnaceae. There are two subspecies: Rhamnus crocea subsp. crocea (redberry buckthorn) and Rhamnus crocea subsp. pilosa (hollyleaf buckthorn). It is native to California, Arizona, and Baja California.

Description
This evergreen shrub, Rhamnus crocea, is typically one to two meters in height. R. crocea typically occurs in chaparral, with common flora associates being toyon and hollyleaf cherry.

Distribution
Rhamnus crocea covers two major mountain foothills. In California, it surrounds the entire San Joaquin Valley, the pacific coast ranges and the western foothills of the Sierra Nevadas. In Arizona, it is found in the entire length of the Mogollon Rim to the western region of the White Mountains.

Uses
The fruit of Rhamnus crocea was used as food by Native Americans in the Western United States. When eaten in large quantities, the berry is reported to impart a red tint to the entire body of the consumer.

References

External links
Jepson Manual Treatment - Rhamnus crocea
USDA Plants Profile; Rhamnus crocea
Rhamnus crocea — UC Photos gallery
Rhamnus crocea — Calflora Taxon Report

crocea
Flora of California
Flora of Baja California
Flora of Arizona
Flora of the Sierra Nevada (United States)
Natural history of the California chaparral and woodlands
Natural history of the California Coast Ranges
Natural history of the Peninsular Ranges
Natural history of the San Francisco Bay Area
Natural history of the Santa Monica Mountains
Natural history of the Transverse Ranges
Plants used in Native American cuisine
Garden plants of North America
Bird food plants
Drought-tolerant plants
Flora without expected TNC conservation status